International Day Against Homophobia, Biphobia, Lesbophobia and Transphobia is observed on May 17 and aims to coordinate international events that raise awareness of LGBT rights violations and stimulate interest in LGBT rights work worldwide. By 2016 the commemorations had taken place in over 130 countries.

The founders of the International Day Against Homophobia, as it was originally known, established the IDAHO Committee to coordinate grass-roots actions in different countries, to promote the day and to lobby for official recognition on May 17. That date was chosen to commemorate the decision to remove homosexuality from the International Classification of Diseases of the World Health Organization (WHO) in 1990.

History

The day, as a concept, was conceived in 2004. A year-long campaign culminated in the first International Day Against Homophobia on May 17, 2005. 24,000 individuals as well as organizations such as the International Lesbian and Gay Association (ILGA), the International Gay and Lesbian Human Rights Commission (IGLHRC), the World Congress of LGBT Jews, and the Coalition of African Lesbians signed an appeal to support the "IDAHO initiative". Activities for the day took place in many countries, including the first LGBT events ever to take place in the Congo, China, and Bulgaria. In the UK, the campaign was coordinated by the Gay and Lesbian Humanist Association (GALHA).

The date of May 17 was specifically chosen to commemorate the World Health Organization’s decision in 1990 to declassify homosexuality as a mental disorder.

In 2009, transphobia was added to the name of the campaign, and activities that year focused primarily on transphobia (violence and discrimination against transgender people). A new petition was launched in cooperation with LGBT organizations in 2009, and it was supported by more than 300 NGOs from 75 countries, as well as three Nobel Prize winners (Elfriede Jelinek, Françoise Barré-Sinoussi, and Luc Montagnier). On the eve of May 17, 2009, France became the first country in the world to officially remove transgender issues from its list of mental illnesses.

Frenchman Louis-Georges Tin was founder of the day, and acted as its Committee Chairperson until his resignation in September 2013. He was succeeded by internationally renowned Venezuelan trans rights activist, lawyer and law professor Tamara Adrián, who became one of the first trans legislators in Latin America in 2015.

Louis-Georges Tin and two other Committee members started a hunger-strike in June 2012 to urge the French president Hollande to introduce a UN resolution decriminalising homosexuality.

Biphobia was added to the name of the campaign in 2015.

The Enforcement Act of Judicial Yuan Interpretation No. 748 that legalised same-sex marriage in Taiwan was passed on International Day Against Homophobia, Transphobia and Biphobia in 2019, with the law coming into effect on 24 May 2019.

Goals and activities
The main purpose of the May 17 mobilisations is to raise awareness of violence, discrimination, and repression of LGBT communities worldwide, which in turn provides an opportunity to take action and engage in dialogue with the media, policymakers, public opinion, and wider civil society.

One of the stated goals of May 17 is to create an event that can be visible at a global level without needing to conform to a specific type of action. This decentralized approach is needed due to the diversity of social, religious, cultural, and political contexts in which rights violations occur. As such, this leads to a variety of events and approaches towards celebrating the International Day Against Homophobia.

Despite the three principal issues mentioned in the name of the celebration, this day is widely regarded as an initiative that is "working to advance the rights of people with diverse sexual orientations, gender identities or expressions, and sex characteristics." This allows for a widespread amalgamation of different self-identified expressions coming together to share pride in oneself, happiness, and love with others as participants take charge against different rampant forms of hate in the world.

May 17 around the world

The day is particularly strong in Europe and Latin America, where it is commemorated with public events in almost all countries.  May 17 is also marked in multiple countries in all world regions including, in 2013, 32 of the 76 countries in the world where same-sex relationships are criminalised.

Common actions include large-scale street marches, parades and festivals. In Cuba, for example, Mariela Castro has led out a huge street parade in honor of May 17 for the past three years. In Chile in 2013, 50,000 people took to the streets to mark May 17, and the VIII Santiago Equality march.

Arts and culture-based events are also common. For example, Bangladeshi activists organised the music festival "Love Music Hate Homophobia" in 2013. Albanian LGBT activists have, in 2012 and 2013 been organising an annual Bike (P) Ride for May 17 through the streets of the capital Tirana.  In 2013, the day's Committee called for international actions for a Global Rainbow Flashmob to mark May 17. Activists in 100 cities, in 50 countries participated with diverse public events spanning coloured balloon releases, dance flashmobs, musical events, and performance and street art.

On May 17, 2019, Taiwan became the first country in Asia to legally recognize same-sex marriage.

In Nepal, this day is celebrated as International Day Against Queer / MOGAI -phobia' as well as IDAHOT.

Official recognition

In 2003 the Canadian organization Fondation Émergence instituted a similar event, the National Day Against Homophobia, which was held on June 1 in Québec. In 2006, they changed the date to May 17, in order to join the international movement.

In 2006, The Declaration of Montreal was created and adopted by the 2006 World Outgames. The Declaration demanded that the United Nations and all states recognize May 17 as the International Day Against Homophobia.

In 2007, in Aosta Valley (Italy), the government approved the support for the IDAHOT.

In 2010, Lula, then president of Brazil, signed an act that instituted May 17 as the National Day Against Homophobia in his country.

The day is also officially recognized by the EU Parliament, Spain, Portugal, Belgium, the UK, Mexico, Costa Rica, Croatia, the Netherlands, France, Luxembourg and Venezuela. It is also recognized by numerous local authorities, such as the province of Quebec or the city of Buenos Aires.

In 2012, the city of Liverpool, England, created a pioneering programme of events in association with the organisation Homotopia, called IDAHO 50. The event was supported by 50 leading organisations based in Liverpool.

On March 21, 2014, Mexico declared, by Presidential Decree, May 17 as the National Day Against Homophobia.

Venezuela's National Assembly (AN) officially recognized May 17 as the Day against Homophobia, Transphobia and Biphobia on May 12, 2016. AN Deputy Tamara Adrian, also international Chairwoman of the IDAHO Committee, hailed the legislative act as a "sign of change" in a Venezuela where "everyone has equal rights and opportunities".

In several other countries (e.g. Argentina, Bolivia, Australia, and Croatia), national civil society coalitions have called upon their authorities to have May 17 officially recognized.

As it stands as of May 17, 2021, the International Day Against Homophobia, Transphobia, and Biphobia has been officially recognized and commemorated by over 130 different countries across the globe.

Impact

, 69 countries criminalize same-sex relationships. Also, in 26 countries, transgender individuals are subjected to punishments, and they are disproportionately at risk of violence across the globe. IDAHOBIT is frequently used as a platform for organizing initiatives to advance the fight for the rights of LGBT+ groups in many countries, even in those (like Uganda) in which homosexuality is criminalized.

In 2021, United States president Joe Biden used IDAHOBIT to highlight efforts to alleviate LGBTQIA+ discrimination and to call on Congress to pass the Equality Act. The same day, Canadian prime minister Justin Trudeau, spoke of creating the first federal LGBTQ2 Action Plan ad passing "legislation to fully protect gender identity and expression".

See also

 Biphobia
 Heteronormativity
 Heterosexism
 Homophobia
 LGBT rights by country or territory
 LGBT social movements
 List of LGBTIQ+ awareness periods
 List of LGBTIQ+ events
 National Day Against Homophobia (Canada)
 National Coming Out Day
 Transgender Day of Remembrance
 Transphobia
 Declaration of Montreal
Human sexuality 
Sexual identity
Societal attitudes toward homosexuality

References

External links

 
International Day Against Homophobia Hong Kong (IDAHO HK)— Regional site of Hong Kong Campaign
RainbowFlash (ru) (en) (de) - Russian-Germany Campaign
Project IDAHO launched by the social network Gays.com and the Committee for the International Day Against Homophobia and Transphobia (IDAHO)
International Lesbian and Gay Association (ILGA)
Cuba & World Day against Homophobia, Havana Times, May 16 2009

Anti-homophobia
Civil awareness days
LGBT events in the United States
May observances
Transphobia
Biphobia
LGBT-related observances